Mount Boyer is a mountain  southwest of Mount Becker, in the Merrick Mountains, Ellsworth Land. It was mapped by the United States Geological Survey from surveys and from U.S. Navy air photos, 1961–67, and named by the Advisory Committee on Antarctic Names for Francis C. Boyer, hospital corpsman, U.S. Navy, chief petty officer in charge of Eights Station in 1964.

References 

Mountains of Ellsworth Land